Tempa Dorji is a Bhutanese politician who has been a member of the National Council of Bhutan, since May 2018. Previously, he was a member of the National Council of Bhutan from 2013 to 2018.

References 

Members of the National Council (Bhutan)
1960s births
Living people